The Summer Kiss Tour was the debut concert tour by Canadian singer Carly Rae Jepsen. It was launched in support of her second studio album, Kiss (2012). The tour received positive reviews and was a commercial success.

Setlist
 "This Kiss"
 "I Know You Have a Girlfriend"
 "Good Time" (with Jared Manierka)
 "Tiny Little Bows"
 "Sweetie"
"Take a Picture"
 "Tug of War"
"Bucket"
"Curiosity"
 "Almost Said It"
 "Sour Candy"
"More Than a Memory"
 "Tonight I'm Getting Over You"
 "Turn Me Up"
 "Hurt So Good"
 "Guitar String / Wedding Ring"
 "Your Heart Is a Muscle"

Encore
 "Call Me Maybe"

Shows

Box office score data

Cancelled shows

Notes

References

Carly Rae Jepsen concert tours
2013 concert tours